Diphylleia rotans is a eukaryotic microorganism. It is notable for having a gene-rich mitochondrial genome, the largest known outside the jakobids.

References

External links 
 

Podiata
Species described in 1920